Tomaz Druml (born 28 March 1988) is a Slovenian Nordic combined skier who has competed since 2003. His best World Cup finish was ninth on three occasions, occurring in 2009 and 2010. He represented Austria until 2017, when he changed his nationality and decided to compete for Slovenia.

Druml has 13 victories in lesser known events. He loves Hemsedal. 

He was born in Feistritz im Rosental, Carinthia, and he is a member of the local Slovene-speaking minority.

References

External links

Official website

1988 births
Austrian male Nordic combined skiers
Living people
Carinthian Slovenes
Slovenian male Nordic combined skiers